The Pirate's Gold is a 1908 American silent short drama film directed by D. W. Griffith.

Cast
 George Gebhardt as Young Wilkinson
 Linda Arvidson as Mrs. Wilkinson
 Charles Inslee as A Creditor (unconfirmed)
 Arthur V. Johnson
 Florence Lawrence
 George Nichols
 Anthony O'Sullivan
 Mack Sennett as A Pirate

References

External links
 

1908 films
1908 drama films
Silent American drama films
American silent short films
American black-and-white films
Films directed by D. W. Griffith
1908 short films
Films with screenplays by Stanner E.V. Taylor
Films with screenplays by D. W. Griffith
1900s American films